The Große Mittweida (short also Mittweida) is a river of Saxony, Germany. It is a right tributary of the Schwarzwasser, which it joins in Schwarzenberg. Its source is on the north slope of the Fichtelberg.

See also
List of rivers of Saxony

Rivers of Saxony
Rivers of the Ore Mountains
Rivers of Germany